Peter Crawford Appling (June 12, 1822 – February 3, 1908) served as a member of the 1869-1871 California State Assembly, representing the 4th District.

Appling was born in Clarke County, Georgia. He died in Madera, California, aged 85.

References

1822 births
1908 deaths
People from Clarke County, Georgia
Members of the California State Assembly
19th-century American politicians